Narlıdere is a district of İzmir Province in Turkey. It is one of the nine districts in the Greater Metropolitan Area of İzmir, one of the smallest in terms both of population and area, and is fully (100.0%) urbanized. The district center has no depending township with own municipalities or villages. Narlıdere district area follows the southern coastline of the inner Gulf of İzmir. Narlıdere district area neighbors the district areas of Balçova to the east, Menderes (Cumaovası) to the south and Güzelbahçe to the west, this last also being westernmost among İzmir's metropolitan districts. Narlıdere district's overall levels of education are among the highest in Turkey, the literacy rate reaching 93 per cent, while the calculations for average yearly income per inhabitant situate Narlıdere rather below the national average, at 2.393 US Dollars, for which its open approach to outside immigration may have played a role. The overall appearance of Narlıdere leaves the impression of a locality where people are generally educated and who subsist on mid- to low-level revenues without being destitute. Narlıdere was founded as a village by semi-nomadic Tahtacı–Alevi Turkmens in the 18th century, whose descendants still constitute the backbone of the population, preserving their particular popular culture and folklore, and maintaining their recently restored seminary, called Cemevi. During the Greek Uprising, Greek pirates from Samos kidnapped these Tahtacı Türkmens for ransom from their relatives day and night and also stole animals and other property as there were no troops in the coast between İzmir and Urla. An Ottoman Archival document from the Porte in February 1825 to Hasan Pasha, Castellan of Izmir, make the distinction and use the word "Türkmen" instead of Türk" The name the district has made as such contributes to its status as pole of attraction for various specific parts of the population in Turkey (its population is projected to have increased from 54.107 to 66.446 between 2000-2006). The economy is still largely based on agriculture (especially citrus fruit and flowers), although new housing projects putting Narlıdere's advantageous location to benefit and generally aimed at high-income residents started to be built in recent years, and there is a five-star hotel. As such, Narlıdere became in recent years one of İzmir's metropolitan districts where the economy grew the fastest.

Narlidere is home to the Turkish Army Combat Engineering School & Training Center .

Footnotes

Resources

 

İzmir
Neighbourhoods of İzmir
Populated places in İzmir Province
Fishing communities in Turkey
Districts of İzmir Province